Båntjern is a tarn in the area of Oslo named Nordmarka. It is situated south of Vettakollen, a hill close to one of Oslo's suburbs. A campsite next to Båntjern offers various facilities including a place for grilling and a diving tower. The name is derived from tales of the ghosts of unbaptized children left in the woods to die alone.

A trail walk continues further west of Båntjern. It leads to the top of Vettakollen, an area with views over the Oslofjord and the Bunnefjord. Southwest of Båntjern is an old mine called Riis Skjerp. One of Oslo's most popular walking trails passes Båntjern.

References

External links 
Voksne oppgaver ved Båntjern
Naturvernforbundet: Naturkart: Fra Sognsvann til Båntjern (PDF)
Skiforeningen om Båntjern
NOA: Eventyrskogene. Område: Vettakollen–Båntjern–Fuglemyra

Lakes of Oslo